Baupur may refer to the following places in India:

Baupur, Jalandhar, Punjab
Baupur, Ludhiana, Punjab